"Monopoly" is a song by American singers Ariana Grande and Victoria Monét, released on April 1, 2019 through Republic Records. The song was written by Grande, Monét, Charles Anderson, Michael Foster, and producer Tim Suby. The music video, which was shot on March 30, 2019 at Mohegan Sun in the hours leading up to a concert scheduled that night, was released alongside the single, and was directed by Alfredo Flores and Ricky Alvarez.

"Monopoly" was included on the Japanese deluxe edition of Grande's fifth studio album Thank U, Next (2019) as a bonus track, along with the official remix of "7 Rings" featuring 2 Chainz. It reached the top five in Greece and Israel and the top 20 in Ireland, Japan and New Zealand. Grande and Monét performed the song on some of the shows of the Sweetener World Tour.

Background
Monét and Grande decided to make a song titled "Monopoly", finding it funny since Monét dislikes the board game and declines to play whenever Grande asks. The song was recorded on February 1, 2019.

"Monopoly" was originally slated for a March 28, 2019 release but was pushed back to April 1, 2019 to celebrate "7 Rings" 8th week at number one on the Billboard Hot 100. Grande said on Twitter that "Monopoly" is about "friendship, freedom, protecting your energy and staying right in your bag." Monét made a similar tweet stating that the track was about "good vibes and celebrations of life and friendship."

Lyrics and composition
"Monopoly" is a trap-pop song, leading Uproxx writer Chloe Gilke to call it the "spiritual successor" to Grande's single "7 Rings" which Monét also co-wrote. The song is a celebration of Grande's success, much like "7 Rings", which charted at number one on the Hot 100 for eight weeks. Monét personally believed it was important to include the line "I like women and men", along with the lyrics "Swerve both ways, Dichotomy" (a double entendre invoking the word dyke), to highlight her sexuality because of the lack of representation for bisexual black women in her industry. In response to the attention garnered by Grande for also singing the "I like women and men" line, Grande opened up about her sexuality and revealed she doesn't label herself, tweeting that "[she hasn't labelled herself] before and still [doesn't] feel the need to now".

Grande also sings "Even though we gave up that 90%", referencing the fact that she had to give up 90% of the royalties for "7 Rings" to Rodgers and Hammerstein due to interpolating the melody of The Sound of Musics "My Favorite Things".

Reception
Vulture praised the song and music video for being a "meme-heavy bisexual bop". NME wrote that following the release of Thank U, Next (2019), "Monopoly" was refreshing to hear, describing the song as "flippant and fun".

The Washington Post, Broadly, and PinkNews reported that certain fans responded negatively to the song, accusing Grande of queerbaiting. Broadly writer Gabrielle Alexa criticized the accusations, stating "the act of speculating only perpetuates attitudes that contribute to the erasure of bisexual women. Grande doesn't have to date a girl in order to count as bisexual. And we shouldn't try to make her prove her sexuality anyways."

Credits and personnel
Credits adapted from Tidal.

 Ariana Grande – vocals, songwriting, vocal production
 Victoria Monét – vocals, songwriting
 Tim Suby – production, songwriting, programming
 Social House – co-production, songwriting, programming
 Kyle Mann – engineering, mixing, studio personnel
 Brendan Morawski – engineering, studio personnel

Charts

Certifications

Release history

References

External links
 Victoria Monét's "Monopoly" Official Lyrics & Meaning, from Genius

2019 songs
2019 singles
Ariana Grande songs
Victoria Monét songs
Music videos shot in the United States
Republic Records singles
Songs written by Ariana Grande
Songs written by Victoria Monét
Songs written by Charles Anderson
Song recordings produced by Charles Anderson
Bisexuality-related songs
Monopoly (game)
Trap music songs